Comedy Central in Sweden was a television channel owned by ViacomCBS Networks EMEAA, broadcasting to Sweden. Viacom International Media Networks have said that the channel will feature both original Swedish productions made for the channel and imported content.

The channel applied for license to broadcast in the terrestrial network in Sweden in February 2008 and on 27 March 2008 they were granted a license to broadcast nationally between 7 p.m. and 3 a.m. from 1 January 2009.

The channel launched on 1 January 2009, opening with an episode of South Park and the Comedy Central Roast of Pamela Anderson. During its first month, the channel launched on Boxer, Canal Digital, Com Hem, Tele2, Telia Digital-tv, SPA, Borderlight and IP Sweden. The channel was added to the Viasat platform on 1 September 2009.

On 5 October 2010, The Daily Show premiered on Comedy Central in Sweden, having previously been broadcast on Canal+ and Kanal 9. The show is broadcast at 7 p.m. Swedish time, only 14 hours after its original U.S. broadcast, and then repeated at 11.05 p.m. This is unusually fast as American talk shows are normally shown with a one-week delay in Sweden.

Programmes available include:
8 Simple Rules
According to Jim
Becker
Californication
Carpoolers
Roast
Dead Like Me
Dirty Sexy Funny
Everybody Hates Chris
Everybody Loves Raymond
Frasier
Important Things with Demetri Martin
Insomniac with Dave Attell
Kenny vs. Spenny
Mind of Mencia
Monk
New Kids
Out Of Practice
Rules Of Engagement
Sex and the City
South Park
Stand-up Saturday
The Colbert Report (Global Edition)
The Jeff Dunham Show
The King of Queens
The Office (US)
Unhappily Ever After

References

External links
https://web.archive.org/web/20171020192602/http://www.comedycentral.se/

2009 establishments in Sweden
Comedy Central
Television channels and stations established in 2009
Television channels and stations disestablished in 2019
Television channels in Sweden